Belvis is a commune in the Aude department in southern France.
Its inhabitants are called the Belvisois.

Population

See also
Communes of the Aude department

References

Communes of Aude
Aude communes articles needing translation from French Wikipedia